Ammotrechula is a genus of ammotrechid camel spiders, first described by Carl Friedrich Roewer in 1934.

Species 
, the World Solifugae Catalog accepts the following twelve species:

 Ammotrechula boneti Mello-Leitão, 1942 — Mexico
 Ammotrechula borregoensis Muma, 1962 — Mexico, US (California, Nevada)
 Ammotrechula catalinae Muma, 1989 — US (Arizona)
 Ammotrechula gervaisii (Pocock, 1895) — Colombia, Ecuador (mainland)
 Ammotrechula lacuna Muma, 1963 — US (Nevada)
 Ammotrechula mulaiki Muma, 1951 — Mexico, US (Texas)
 Ammotrechula peninsulana (Banks, 1898) — Mexico, US (Arizona, New Mexico, Texas)
 Ammotrechula pilosa Muma, 1951 — US (Arizona, California, Nevada, Texas)
 Ammotrechula saltatrix (Simon, 1879) — Mexico
 Ammotrechula schusterae Roewer, 1954 — El Salvador, Nicaragua
 Ammotrechula venusta Muma, 1951 — Mexico, US (Arizona)
 Ammotrechula wasbaueri Muma, 1962 — US (California)

References 

Arachnid genera
Solifugae